Hayes Head is a prominent headland,  high, overlooking the northern extremity of Wood Bay, and standing  north of Kay Island on the coast of Victoria Land, Antarctica. It was mapped by the United States Geological Survey from surveys and U.S. Navy air photos, 1955–63, and was named by the Advisory Committee on Antarctic Names for Miles O. Hayes, a geologist at McMurdo Station in the 1965–66 season.

References

Headlands of Victoria Land
Borchgrevink Coast